Riki Guy (born c. 1975) is an Israeli full-lyric soprano.

Education 
Riki Guy graduated from the Jerusalem Academy of Music and Dance in 1997. Master classes and private coaching include work with voice professionals such as William Woodruff, Joan Dorneman, Ileana Cotrubaș, Silvia Sass, Vera Rozsa, Mignon Dunn, Renata Scotto, Diana Soviero, Gabriel Bacquier, Eliane Manchet and Sherrill Milnes.

Awards 
In 2002, Riki Guy won the International Media Prize, the Prize of the Chambre Professionnelle des Directeurs d’Opera, and the special prize of the Leipzig opera at the Hans Gabor Belvedere Competition in Vienna. In 2001, Ms. Guy won First Prize in the opera category, at the International Vocal Competition in Marmande, France.

In 2000, Riki Guy won first prize in the Vera Rozsa Vocal Competition, and later that year she won first prize in the "Lions" Vocal Competition, both in Israel. That year, Riki Guy also won the special prize granted by the chairman of the jury of the Romeo et Juliette competition in Budapest.

Scholarships and awards include the Israel Vocal Arts Institute scholarships (1996–2006), America Israel Cultural Foundation scholarships (1993–2002). Additional important awards include two New Israeli Opera awards – the "Grebov" Prize in 2000 and the "Basser" Prize in 1999.

Stage roles 

 Giulietta, The Tales of Hoffmann: Zurich Opera House 2009/10, Lisbon Opera House 2007/08, Leipzig Opera House 2002/03/06
 Antonia, The Tales of Hoffmann: Graz Opera House 2005/06, International Vocal Arts Institute 2004
 Micaela, Carmen: Aalto Theatre Essen 2002/03, Deutsche Oper am Rhein 2002/03, New Israeli Opera 2002
 Mimi, La bohème: Volkstheater Rostock 2002/03
 Second Niece, Peter Grimes: New Israeli Opera 2002
 Angelica, Suor Angelica: International Vocal Arts Institute 2002
 First Soprano, St. Mattheus Passion: New Israeli Opera 2002
 Pallade Venus, L'incoronazione di Poppea: New Israeli Opera 2002
 Pamina, The Magic Flute: Israel Philharmonic Orchestra 2001
 Angel & Nurse, Alfa and Omega: New Israeli Opera 2001
 Contessa & Ceprano, Rigoletto: New Israeli Opera 2000
 Adina, L'elisir d'amore: International Vocal Arts Institute 1999
 Princess, L'enfant et les sortilèges: International Vocal Arts Institute 1998
 Musetta, La bohème: International Vocal arts institute 1997
 Gretel, Hänsel and Gretel: Israel Philharmonic Orchestra 1997
 Dido, Dido and Æneas: Music Days Festival 1997

Orchestral engagements and recitals 

  (Beethoven): Easter Festival Warsaw 2006
 Coronation Mass/Lobgesang: Bochum Symphonic 2003/04
 Several works: Staatsorchester Kassel 2003/04
 Aria Concert: The Lions Club – Maggio Musicale; Fiorentino, Teatro Comunale 2001
 Aria Concert: Haifa Symphony 2000
 Bach Arias: Israeli Philharmonic Orchestra 1996
 A Midsummer Night's Dream (Mendelssohn): Israeli Philharmonic Orchestra 1995
 Stabat Mater (Pergolesi): The Israel Sinfonietta Beer–Sheva 1991

References 
 Riki Guy, OIA-POILVE Artist Management
 Voice and Singing Technique - Riki's Hebrew Site

Living people
1970s births
Israeli operatic sopranos
Place of birth missing (living people)
Year of birth uncertain
21st-century Israeli women opera singers